Victor Alonso García (born 9 March 1990 in Gijón),  commonly known as Victor Alonso is a Spanish handball player for Pallamano Romagna in the Serie A Gold and former Spanish national team player.

He reached fifth place with Ademar León in the 2013–14 season of ASOBAL, scoring 98 goals in 18 games for its team.

On 5 November 2020, García declared that he has started to adjust after the transfer to Besa Famgas and that he is feeling at home, while does not exclude the possibility to play for the Kosovo national team, if the handball federation and national team's technical staff deems it necessary.

Achievements
Copa del Rey:
Finalist: 2011

Kosovar Handball Superliga:
Winners: 2021, 2022

Kosovo Cup:
Winners: 2021, 2022

References

1990 births
Spanish male handball players
Living people
Sportspeople from Gijón
Spanish expatriate sportspeople in France
Expatriate handball players
Liga ASOBAL players
SDC San Antonio players
BM Valladolid players
CB Ademar León players
Spanish expatriate sportspeople in Romania